The 1345 Liverpool riot took place on St Valentine's Day that year when a large body of armed men entered the town of Liverpool and attacked the Courts. 

Having unfurled banners, the mob broke into the court—while the Justices of the Peace were in session—and began abusing them. What began with hurling insults escalated into violence, and swiftly following their "'insulting and contumacious words", the armed mob "did wickedly kill, mutilate, and plunder of their goods, and wound very many persons there assembled, and further did prevent the justices from showing justice" as they were due to.

A Commission of the Peace was held three weeks later to bring to justice those involved; many of whom, it was discovered, were propertied men. By July, Henry, Earl of Lancaster had ensured that most of them had received royal pardons on condition that they joined his military campaign to Gascony. Recent scholarship has indicated that the riots were an extension of an on-going feud between two gentry families, the Radcliffe and Trafford families, all of whose retainers were later found among the accused.   

There were a number of casualties among each family. Of the Traffords, says the Victoria County History, "Geoffrey son of Sir Henry de Trafford; Richard de Trafford, son of Sir John the elder, and John and Robert his brothers; also Richard brother of Henry de Trafford" were all killed. Robert Ratcliffe also died the day of the riot, but in his particular case, there is some uncertainty whether his death was directly the result of injuries sustained in the riot.

Notes

References

Bibliography 

 
 

1345 in England
14th-century riots
Conflicts in 1345